The eleventh season of La Voz premiered in June 6, 2022 on Azteca Uno. The coaching panel is formed by David Bisbal, Yuridia, Ha*Ash and Joss Favela, who replaced María José, Miguel Bosé, Edith Márquez and Jesús Navarro. Eddy Vilard and Sofía Aragón both returned for their third season as hosts.

On Monday, August 29, 2022, Fátima Elizondo was announced the winner and crowned La Voz México 2022, alongside her coach Yuridia. 

Yuridia became the second coach, after Carlos Rivera in season seven, to win the show after both being participants of TV Azteca's musical reality La Academia.

Coaches 

Prior to filming starting in April 2022, reporter Pati Chapoy leaked that Yuridia and musical sister duo Ha*Ash would be coaches of this new season. Days later, they were officially confirmed by the TV network alongside the announcement of David Bisbal and Joss Favela, who had coached the third season and fourth kids version season, respectively.

Teams 
Color key

 Winner
 Runner-up
 Third place
 Fourth place
 Eliminated in the Final Phase
 Eliminated in the Top 3
 Stolen in the Battles
 Eliminated in the Battles
 Stolen in the Knockouts
 Eliminated in the Knockouts
 Withdrew

Blind auditions 
In the Blind auditions, each coach had to complete their team with 30 contestants. In this season, contestants who fail to pass the blind audition will leave the stage without a conversation with coaches being returned. Also, each coach had given four Blocks to prevent one of the other coaches from getting a contestant.

Episode 1 (June 6)

At the beginning of the episode, Ha*Ash performed "Perdón, Perdón", David Bisbal performed "Dígale", Joss Favela performed "Te hubieras ido antes" and Yuridia performed "Ya es muy tarde".

Episode 2 (June 7)
During the episode, David Bisbal performed "Se nos rompió el amor" and Yuridia performed "Ya te olvidé".

Episode 3 (June 13)

During the episode, David Bisbal performed "Abriré la puerta" and Joss Favela performed "Gato de madrugada".

Episode 4 (June 14)

During the episode, Ha*Ash performed "Te Dejo en Libertad" and Yuridia performed "Amigos no por favor".

Episode 5 (June 20)
During the episode, Ha*Ash performed "Lo aprendí de ti" and Yuridia performed "La duda".

Episode 6 (June 21)
During the episode, David Bisbal performed "El Ruido" and Ha*Ash performed "Estés Donde Estés".

Episode 7 (June 27)
During the episode, Joss Favela performed "Egoista" and Yuridia performed "Te equivocaste".

Episode 8 (June 28)
During the episode, David Bisbal performed "Mi Princesa" and Ha*Ash performed "¿Qué Hago Yo?".

Knockouts 
The knockouts round started July 4. Contrary to the last three seasons, each coach groups their artist into pairs. One artist of the pair will advance to the battles while other coaches can steal the loser. In this round, coaches can steal three losing artists from other coaches. Contestants who win their knockout or are stolen by another coach advance to the Battles.

Battles 
The battles round started July 18. In this round, coaches can steal three losing artists from other coaches. Contestants who win their battle or are stolen by another coach advance to the Top 3 round.

Top 3 
The Top 3 round started on August 1. Contrary to the previous three seasons, each coach had to make three groups of four artists from their team to compete during a span of 3 episodes. At the end of all four performances, the coach could only advance with one of the artists to form the Top 3. At the end of this round, the artist chosen in each episode, advanced into the Semifinal.

Final phase

Day 1: Semifinal (August 22) 

In the Semifinal, the twelve remaining participants performed in order to become one of their coach's choice to advance into the Finale. Each coach advanced with two artists, with the third member being eliminated.

Day 2: Finale (August 29) 
The Finale was prerecorded. In the first round, the participants sang a solo song. Following those performances, each coach had to choose one artist to advance to the second round. In the second round, the four finalists performed a duet with their coach. The show's production shot four different winning results (one per finalist), but only the chosen winner by the public at home one was shown on TV.

First round

Second round

Elimination chart

Color key 
Artist's info

Result details

Artists who appeared on other shows or in previous seasons 
 Adrianna Foster participated in the first season of La Voz U.S. on team Guzmán.
 Sebastián Espejo auditioned in the ninth season, but failed to turn any chairs.
 Dania González participated in La Apuesta on team Pepe Aguilar and in the second season of Pequeños gigantes
 José María Ortega participated in the first season El Retador Mx
 Anyelique Solorio participated in the third season of Pequeños gigantes
 Alfonsina Aguirre participated in the second season Rojo, el color del talento.
 Joel Anaya participated in the fourth season of La Voz... México on team Ricky.
 Víctor Bermant auditioned in the first season of La Voz... Kids, but failed to turn any chairs.

References 

Mexico
Azteca Uno original programming
2022 Mexican television seasons